Trichadenotecnum sexpunctatum is a species of Psocoptera from the Psocidae family that can be found in Great Britain and Ireland. The species are brownish-black coloured, but can also be yellowish-black, and striped. It can easily be mistaken for a wasp.

Habitat
The species feed on alder, ash, beech, blackthorn, hazel, oak, pine, privet, spruce, sallow, and yew.

References

Insects described in 1758
Psocoptera of Europe
Psocidae
Taxa named by Carl Linnaeus